Marginal man or marginal man theory is a sociological concept first developed by sociologists Robert Ezra Park (1864–1944) and Everett Stonequist (1901–1979) to explain how an individual suspended between two cultural realities may struggle to establish his or her identity.

Marginal man
The term "marginal man" was first coined by sociologist Robert Ezra Park in 1926 to describe an individual influenced by two differing ethnic or racial groups. According to Park:

Marginal culture
In the 1950s, sociologist Milton M. Goldberg expanded Park and Stonequist's "marginal man" concept labeling it "marginal culture." In the 1940s and 1950s, the "marginal man" and "marginal culture" concepts were used as grand theories for explaining the sociology of American Jewry.

See also

 Bicultural identity

Double consciousness, a similar term coined by W. E. B. Du Bois

References

Sociological terminology
Identity (social science)
Cross-cultural psychology